The Partysquad is a Dutch DJ production team. It consists of Jerry Leembruggen, Ruben Fernhout and Lorenzo Biemans. Since the early 2000s they have had 12 singles charting on the Dutch Top 40. They produced part of British rapper M.I.A.'s fourth and fifth albums, Matangi, released in 2013, and AIM, released in 2016.

Career 
The Partysquad started producing in the hip hop genre, collaborating with many Dutch rappers. In 2006, they released a hip hop album titled De Bazen Van De Club. The album spawned 6 singles between 2006 and 2007, all of which charted on the Dutch Single Top 100 chart. The song "Rampeneren" with Ali B and Yes-R also peaked at No. 4 on the Dutch Top 40. "Wat Wil Je Doen" was featured on the soundtrack of the 2005 Dutch comedy film Het Schnitzelparadijs.

Since 2007, the group switched to producing in a wide range of music genres including electro house, reggae, dub and trap. They have performed as opening acts for 50 Cent, Kanye West and the Pussycat Dolls, among others.

In 2008, the group went on hiatus, after DJ Jerry had a car accident which left him in coma. As he recovered, the Partysquad made a comeback in 2010, collaborating with Afrojack for the single "A Msterdamn". In 2009, they signed to Diplo's record label Mad Decent and released their first international EP Hollertronix #10 under the label. Their breakthrough on the U.S. dance scene came with the reggae-influenced collaboration track with Major Lazer titled "Original Don". After the success of the song, the Partysquad created a 6-song EP Badman Rave EP, which expanded on the style of "Original Don". The group described their sound as "experimental rave EDM". The Partysquad created their own label Rebel Yard, as sub-label of Spinnin' Records. Among the artists signed to the label are DJs and producers Armand van Helden, A-Trak, Boaz, FS Green, Major Lazer and Yellow Claw, and rappers M.I.A., Sjaak and the Opposites.

In 2014, the Partysquad remixed "Dibby Dibby Sound" by DJ Fresh vs. Jay Fay featuring Ms. Dynamite.

The Partysquad brought together more than sixty artists on their 20-track album Nachtwacht in 2018 with names like Ronnie Flex, Lil Kleine, Bizzey, Outsiders and Mr. Polska.

In 2021 MC Laurent joint the group and started perfoming live shows with DJ Jerry so MC Ruben could fully focus on making music. In 2022 they signed an exclusive licensing deal with Warner Music Benelux and released new Dutch singles including names like Antoon, Broederliefde and LA$$A.

Discography

Studio albums
De Bazen Van De Club (2006)
Nachtwacht (2018)

Extended plays
Hollertronix #10 (2009)
Badman Rave EP (2012)
Wake M' Up EP (2014)

Singles

As lead artist

Other releases
 "Showrocker" (with Bassjackers) (2010) (Spinnin)
 "My Bad" (with Roxy Cottontail) (2011) (Spinnin)
 "For Your Love" (with When Harry Met Sally & Caprice) (2011) (Spinnin)
 "Wataah" (with Alvaro) (2012) (Spinnin)
 "Tranga" (with Illuminati AMS) (2012) (Rebel Yard)
 "Oh My" (with  Boaz van de Beatz) (2012) (Rebel Yard)
 "Alright" (with  Tommie Sunshine) (2012)
 "The Lion" (2013) (Rebel Yard)
 "Sunset" (with  Billy the Kit) (2013) (Rebel Yard)
 "How Many DJs" (with  Dirtcaps) (2014) (Rebel Yard)
 "Born to Rave" (with  Rob Pix) (2014) (Rebel Yard)
 "Dat Is Dat Ding" (featuring Jayh, Reverse, Cho, Bokoesam & Mocromaniac) (2015) (Top Notch)
 "ChanChan" (Rebel Yard) (2015)
 "Time to Rave" (with  Punish) (Rebel Yard) (2015)
 "Bombshell" (featuring Maikal X) (Rebel Yard) (2015)
 "Mi Gal" (Rebel Yard) (2015)
 "Pum Pum" (Rebel Yard) (2016)
 "Lights Out" (with Alvaro) (Rebel Yard) (2016)
 "Bring You Home" (featuring James Francis) (Gemstone Records) (2018)

Remixes (known)
 Tommie Sunshine & Disco Fries ft. Kid Sister - "Cool Without You" (The Partysquad Remix)
 Clockwork - "Titan" (The Partysquad Remix)
 DJ Fresh vs. Jay Fay ft. Ms. Dynamite - "Dibby Dibby Sound" (The Partysquad Remix)
 Woot - "Don't You" (The Partysquad Remix)
 Punish & Ruthless - "FKN BASS" (The Partysquad Remix)
 Yellow Claw ft. Sjaak & Mr. Polska - "Krokobil" (The Partysquad Remix)

As featured artist

Guest appearances

References

External links 
 Official website
 De Missie van The PartySquad, Statemagazine.

Dutch DJs
Dutch musical duos
Dutch electronic music groups
Dutch dance music groups
Dutch hip hop groups
Electronic dance music duos
Reggae fusion groups